A Palestinian family is a large community of extended family members with a lineage that can be traced to ancestors who resided in Palestine.

Families
There are numerous prominent Palestinian families who have contributed to the society, politics and economy of historical Palestine. Usage of the term Palestinian tribe is relatively uncommon and has differed depending on context. One refers to ancient tribes typically described in scriptures and Abrahamic religious texts, such as the Hivites. However, the historicity of such communities is often questioned due to their claimed descent from Noah who is described by some academic references and tertiary sources as being a fictional figure.
More modern groups however are verifiable and include the Khalidi family, the El-Issa family, the al-Husayni family, the Abu-Ezam family, the Nashashibi family, the Tuqan family, the Nusaybah family, Shawish clan, The Barakat family, Shaath family, Shurrab family, Al-Khalil family, Ridwan dynasty, Al-Zeitawi family, Abu Ghosh clan, Doghmush clan, Douaihy family, Hilles clan, Jarrar family, Negev Bedouins, the Jayyusi family, and the Al-Risheq family. Prominent Palestinian families sometimes assigned specific roles to members of their community. For example, Khalidi and Alami clan members held senior administrative positions in society. One of the oldest and biggest families in Palestine is the Barghouti family who trace their ancestors back over 1000 years with over 2.65 million family members with the majority spread over seven countries. Genetical tests have proved that the family is closely related to the prophet Mohammad’s friend Omar Bin Al-khattab which has given them a big role in the politics of Islam. The Barghouti family claims to have ancestral roots in Spain though this has not been independently confirmed.

Significant Christians
Although Palestinian Christians represent a relatively small minority, many of the most socioeconomically influential families in Palestine have been Christian. The El-Issa family, from Jaffa, are one of the most well known families due to their numerous contributions to Palestinian journalism dating from the late 1800s to the middle of the 20th century. Their first newspaper Al-Asma'i' dates back as early as 1887. Another prominent well-to-do Greek Orthodox family, the Abu-Ezam family, were of the wealthiest business families in Ramla. The Abu-Ezam family owned and operated multiple businesses that ranged from the manufacturing of halva, a sweet confection popular in the Levant, to construction materials.

References